Corydalus is a genus of large flying insects in the Corydalidae family, commonly known as dobsonflies. They are endemic to North, Central and South America and there are about 35 known species. Members of the genus have wing lengths of up to 85 millimetres. They are sexually dimorphic, with the males having large mandibles used to grasp the females during mating while the females have smaller jaws. The larvae are known as hellgrammites and are aquatic predators.

Etymology
Corydalus (also transcribed corydalis) comes from the Greek (κορυδαλλις) meaning a crested lark or the flower, larkspur, apparently related to Greek corys (κορυς) a helmet crest. The name probably refers to the long mandibles of the male which might be considered to resemble the crest of a lark, or perhaps, the decorative crests of a helmet.

Species
 Corydalus affinis Burmeister, 1839 - Argentina, Bolivia, Brazil, Colombia, Ecuador, French Guiana, Guyana, Paraguay, Peru, Venezuela
 Corydalus amazonas Contreras-Ramos, 1998 - Brazil
 Corydalus armatus Hagen, 1861 - Argentina, Bolivia, Brazil(?), Colombia, Ecuador, Peru, Venezuela
 Corydalus arpi Navás, 1936 - Venezuela
 Corydalus australis Contreras-Ramos, 1998 - Argentina, Brazil, Uruguay
 Corydalus batesii McLachlan, 1867 - Bolivia, Brazil, Colombia, Ecuador, French Guiana, Guyana, Peru, Suriname, Venezuela
 Corydalus bidenticulatus Contreras-Ramos, 1998 - Mexico, Arizona
 Corydalus cephalotes Rambur, 1842 - Brazil
 Corydalus clauseni Contreras-Ramos, 1998 - Colombia, Costa Rica, Ecuador
 Corydalus clavijoi Contreras-Ramos, 2002
 Corydalus colombianus Contreras-Ramos, 1998 - Colombia
 Corydalus cornutus (Linnaeus, 1758) - Eastern dobsonfly - Eastern North America
 Corydalus crossi Contreras-Ramos, 2002
 Corydalus diasi Navás, 1915 - Argentina, Brazil, Paraguay
 Corydalus ecuadorianus Banks, 1948 - Ecuador
 Corydalus flavicornis Stitz, 1914 - Colombia, Costa Rica, Ecuador, El Salvador, Guatemala, Honduras, Panama, Peru, Venezuela
 Corydalus flinti Contreras-Ramos, 1998 - Venezuela
 Corydalus hayashii Contreras-Ramos, 2002
 Corydalus hecate McLachlan, 1866 - Brazil, Peru, Venezuela
 Corydalus holzenthali Contreras-Ramos, 1998 - Bolivia, Peru
 Corydalus ignotus Contreras-Ramos, 1998 - French Guiana
 Corydalus imperiosus Contreras-Ramos, 1998 - Argentina
 Corydalus longicornis Contreras-Ramos, 1998 - Argentina, Bolivia, Ecuador
 Corydalus luteus Hagen, 1861 - Southern United States, Mexico, Central America
 Corydalus magnus Contreras-Ramos, 1998 - Central America
 Corydalus mayri Contreras-Ramos, 2002
 Corydalus neblinensis Contreras-Ramos, 1998 - Venezuela
 Corydalus nubilus Erichson, 1848 - Brazil, French Guiana, Guyana, Venezuela
 Corydalus parvus  Stitz, 1914 - Ecuador, Peru
 Corydalus peruvianus K. Davis, 1903 - Argentina, Bolivia, Colombia, Costa Rica, Ecuador, Guatemala, Mexico, Panama, Peru, Venezuela
 Corydalus primitivus Van der Weele, 1909 - Argentina, Bolivia
 Corydalus territans Needham, 1909
 Corydalus tesselatus Stitz, 1914 - Venezuela
 Corydalus texanus Banks, 1903 - Southwest United States, Guatemala, Mexico
 Corydalus tridentatus Stitz 1914 - Brazil

References

Corydalidae
Insects of Central America
Insect genera